HMS H5 was a British H-class submarine of the Royal Navy that served in the First World War. The boat, which was launched in June 1915, was lost after being rammed by a British merchant ship off Caernarfon Bay in March 1916. It had been mistaken as a German U-boat and sank with the loss of all hands.

Design

H5 was fitted with a  Hotchkiss quick-firing gun (6-pounder) and four  torpedo tubes. Its torpedo tubes were fitted to the bows and the submarine carried eight  torpedoes. She is a Holland 602 type submarine but was designed to meet Royal Navy specifications. Her complement was twenty-two crew members.

Service record
On 14 July 1916 H5 spotted the  leaving the Ems and torpedoed her. U-51 sank with the loss of 34 of her crew; four men survived.

Sinking
HMS H5 was sunk after being rammed by the British merchantman Rutherglen when mistaken for a German U-boat on 2 March 1918. All on board perished including a US Navy observer, Lieutenant Earle Wayne Freed Childs from the American submarine AL-2. He became the first US submariner to lose his life in the First World War. All on board are commemorated on Panel 29 at Royal Navy Submarine Museum.  The wreck's site is designated as a controlled site under the Protection of Military Remains Act. In 2010, a plaque commemorating the 26 crew was dedicated on Armed Forces Day in Holyhead.

References

 MCA website: controlled sites under the Protection of Military Remains Act 
 SI 2008/950 Designation under the Protection of Military Remains Act 1986

 

British H-class submarines
Ships built in Quebec
1915 ships
World War I submarines of the United Kingdom
Royal Navy ship names
Maritime incidents in 1918
World War I shipwrecks in the Atlantic Ocean
Protected Wrecks of Wales
Submarines sunk in collisions
1915 in Quebec
1918 in Wales
Warships lost with all hands